Araianwala  is a village in Kapurthala district of Punjab State, India. It is located 7 km away from Kapurthala , which is both district & sub-district headquarter of Araianwala village.  The village is administrated by Sarpanch an elected representative of the village.

Demography 
According to the report published by Census India in 2011, Araianwala has a total number of 152 houses and population of 812 of which include 421 males and 391 females. Literacy rate of Araianwala is 74.01%, lower than state average of 75.84%. The population of children under the age of 6 years is 108 which is 13.30% of total population of Araianwala, and child sex ratio is approximately 929 higher than state average of 846.

Population data

Air travel connectivity 
The closest airport to the village is Sri Guru Ram Dass Jee International Airport.

Villages in Kapurthala

External links
  Villages in Kapurthala
 Kapurthala Villages List

References

Villages in Kapurthala district